Steve Chang, is a Taiwanese businessperson and the co-founder and former CEO of Trend Micro, the world's largest software security firm. He was named "Star of Asia" by the Business Week in 1999, and he was selected as one of the six protagonists of the Discovery Channel's Portraits Taiwan II in 2006.

Life
Chang was born in Pingtung, Taiwan. After graduating from National Pingtung Senior High School, Chang attended Fu Jen Catholic University's Department of Mathematics where he earned a bachelor's degree in 1977, then he studied in the United States and obtained a master's degree in computer science from Lehigh University in 1979.

After returning to Taiwan, he worked for Hewlett-Packard and was the head of sales operations in seven counties and cities in southern Taiwan. In 1988, he founded Trend Micro in the US with his wife Jenny Chen and his wife's sister Eva Chen.

In 1999, Chang won the Fu Jen Outstanding Alumni Award with the Harvard University professor Lee-Jen Wei and nine other people. In the same year, he was also named "Star of Asia" by the Business Week. One decade later, Chang won the CNBC 8th Asian Business Leaders Award.

He retired in 2006, and lives in Hualien, Taiwan.

Literary work

See also
Trend Micro
Tomofun

References

External links
Steve Chang, Trend Micro Inc: Profile and Biography - Bloomberg Markets

Living people
Taiwanese chief executives
Businesspeople from Taichung
Taiwanese company founders
American people of Taiwanese descent
Fu Jen Catholic University alumni
Lehigh University alumni
1954 births
20th-century Taiwanese businesspeople
21st-century Taiwanese businesspeople